The SAN Jodel D.140 Mousquetaire (Musketeer) is a French five-seat light touring monoplane based on the earlier Jodel D.117 and built by Société Aéronautique Normande (SAN) at Bernay.

Development
SAN had been producing the earlier Jodel D.117 under licence from which it then developed the larger 4 to 5-seat D.140. The prototype D.140 registration F-BIZE first flew on 4 July 1958. Early versions had a low triangular-shaped fin and rudder.

The final version was a glider tug variant the D.140R Abeille. Both the D.140E and D.140R were ordered by the French Air Force. As well as 243 factory-built aircraft more than 20 have been homebuilt from plans. The type was flown by aero clubs and private owners and remains in use in 2014.

Plans remained available in 2015.

Variants

D.140 Mousquetaire
Prototype powered by a 180hp Lycoming O-360 engine, one built.
D.140A Mousquetaire
Production variant with cabin ventilation, 45 built.
D.140B Mousquetaire II
Improved variant with better brakes, new engine cowling and better ventilation, 56 built.
D.140C Mousquetaire III
A D.140B with an enlarged swept tail, 70 built.
D.140E Mousquetaire IV
A D.140C with a further enlarged tail, modified ailerons and an all flying elevator/tailplane, 43 built.
D.140R Abeille
Glider towing variant with cut-down rear fuselage, new high vision canopy, 28 built first flown in 1965.

Operators

French Air and Space Force

Specifications (D.140)

References

Notes

Bibliography

1950s French civil utility aircraft
Mousquetaire
Low-wing aircraft
Single-engined tractor aircraft
Jodel aircraft
Aircraft first flown in 1958
Conventional landing gear